The 1960 Paris–Tours was the 54th edition of the Paris–Tours cycle race and was held on 2 October 1960. The race started in Paris and finished in Tours. The race was won by Jo de Haan of the Saint-Raphaël team.

General classification

References

1960 in French sport
1960
1960 Super Prestige Pernod
October 1960 sports events in Europe